A solicitor general or solicitor-general, in common law countries, is usually a legal officer who is the chief representative of a regional or national government in courtroom proceedings. In systems that have an attorney-general (or equivalent position), the solicitor general is often the second-ranked law officer of the state and a deputy of the attorney-general. The extent to which a solicitor general actually provides legal advice to or represents the government in court varies from jurisdiction to jurisdiction, and sometimes between individual office holders in the same jurisdiction.

List
Solicitors General include the following:

Australia
In Australia the role of the Solicitor-General is as the second law officer after the Attorney-General. At federal level, the position of Solicitor-General of Australia was created in 1916 and until 1964 was held by the secretary of the Attorney-General's Department. It has always been held by a public servant. At state (and prior to 1901, colonial) level, the position has existed since the granting of self-government in the 19th century, and until the early 20th century was held by a member of parliament. During the 20th century there have been significant changes to the role, becoming increasingly independent and non-political to balance the increasing political engagement of the Attorney-General. Criminal litigation has largely been devolved to the various Directors of Public Prosecution. The Solicitor-General provides legal advice to the executive and represents the relevant government in court proceedings, particularly in constitutional matters.
Solicitor-General of Australia
Solicitor-General of the Australian Capital Territory
Solicitor General for New South Wales
Solicitor-General of the Northern Territory
Solicitor-General of Queensland
Solicitor-General of South Australia
Solicitor-General of Tasmania
Solicitor-General of Victoria
Solicitor-General of Western Australia

Canada
Solicitor General of Canada, a role now performed by the Minister of Public Safety and Emergency Preparedness
Solicitor General of Ontario, responsible for police and other law enforcement agencies in the province of Ontario

United Kingdom
In the United Kingdom:
Solicitor General for England and Wales, the deputy for the Attorney General for England and Wales
Solicitor General for Scotland, the deputy of the Lord Advocate of Scotland
Solicitor General to the Duchy of Cornwall, one of two royal duchies in England, the other being the Duchy of Lancaster

United States
Solicitor General of the United States, the federal government's primary advocate before the U.S. Supreme Court
In states in the United States, a state's Solicitor General is usually the top appellate advocate on behalf of the State, its executives and officials, and its legislature (sometimes referred to as State Solicitor, or Appellate Chief, depending upon the particular state). In many states, the Solicitor General also formulates a state's legal position in significant out-of-state cases before the Supreme Court of the United States. State Solicitors General include, among others:
Solicitor General of Alabama, the top appellate advocate in the State of Alabama.
Solicitor General of Florida, the top appellate advocate for the State of Florida
Solicitor General of Hawaii, the top appellate advocate in the State of Hawaii
Solicitor General of Michigan, the top appellate advocate for the State of Michigan
Solicitor General of Missouri, the top appellate advocate for the State of Missouri.
State Solicitor of New Jersey, the top appellate advocate in the State of New Jersey
Solicitor General of New York, the top appellate advocate in the State of New York
Solicitor General of Ohio, the top appellate advocate in the State of Ohio
Solicitor General of Texas, the top appellate advocate in the State of Texas
Solicitor General of Vermont, the top appellate advocate in the State of Vermont
Solicitor General of Washington, the top appellate advocate in the State of Washington.
Solicitor General of West Virginia, the top appellate advocate in the State of West Virginia.

Though not a state, the District of Columbia also has an Office of the Solicitor General.

Other countries
In the British West Indies:
Solicitor General of Leeward Islands
Solicitor General of Barbados
Solicitor-General of Belize, a law officer of the government of Belize, subordinate to the Attorney-General of Belize
Solicitor General of Grenada
Solicitor-General (Fiji), the Chief Executive Officer of the Attorney-General's Chambers, and as such assists the Attorney-General in advising the government on legal matters, and in performing legal work for the government
Solicitor General of Hong Kong, until 1979, deputy to the Attorney-General; since 1981, head of the Legal Policy Division of the Department of Justice (Chinese: 律政司) in Hong Kong
Solicitor General of India, Attorney General of India

Solicitor-General for Ireland, deputy to the Attorney-General for Ireland, until 1922
Solicitor-General of New Zealand, the second law officer of state and public servant representing the Attorney-General in court proceedings
Solicitor-General of the Philippines
Solicitor General of Sri Lanka, the deputy for the Attorney General for Sri Lanka
Solicitor-General of Singapore, formerly the deputy of the Attorney-General of Singapore, now subordinate to the Deputy Attorney-General of Singapore.

See also
Attorney general, the main legal advisor to the government. In some jurisdictions the attorney general may also have executive responsibility for law enforcement or responsibility for public prosecutions
Justice of the peace, sometimes used with the same meaning
Law officers of the Crown, the chief legal advisers to the Crown, and advise and represent the various governments in the United Kingdom and the other Commonwealth Realms
Solicitor, a lawyer who traditionally deals with any legal matter including conducting proceedings in court
Solicitor (South Carolina), a state elected position equivalent to a district attorney in many other states

References

Legal professions